Knarrholmen is a small and very exclusive  island in the Southern Gothenburg Archipelago of Sweden. There is a fine dining restaurant close to the main harbour, a professional padel court and 57 luxury houses and studios. http://knarrholmensrest.se https://www.padelcenter.se/se/knarrholmen/

Southern Gothenburg Archipelago
Islands of Västra Götaland County